Fernando Leonel Cortés Monroy (born January 29, 1988) is a former Mexican football striker. He last played for Alebrijes de Oaxaca in Mexico.

Born in Pachuca, Cortés, who spent two years in the Pachuca youth system, made his professional debut on April 25, 2009, in a 3–0 win against Cruz Azul, coming on as a substitute during the 81st minute.

External links

1988 births
Living people
Sportspeople from Pachuca
Footballers from Hidalgo (state)
Association football forwards
C.F. Pachuca players
Club Puebla players
Liga MX players
Mexican footballers